Edward Coleman may refer to:
Edward Coleman (martyr), victim of the Titus Oates plot
Edward Coleman (gangster) (died 1839), Irish gang founder in New York City
Edward Coleman (miner) (1830–1913), California Gold Rush mine manager, president and superintendent
Edward Coleman (veterinary surgeon) (1766–1839), English veterinary surgeon
Edward Coleman (cricketer) (1891–1917), English cricketer

See also
Ed Coleman (disambiguation)
Edward Colman (disambiguation)